The Sunshine State Standards (now called Next Generation Sunshine State Standards or NGSSS) are broad statements that describe the knowledge or ability that a student should be able to demonstrate by the end of every grade level from first through twelfth grade. These standards cover eight content areas: English Language Arts, Mathematics, Science, Social Studies, Physical Education, World Languages, Fine Arts, and Health Education. The standards are subdivided into "benchmarks," which outline the specific content, knowledge, and skills that students are expected to learn in school. Each student's performance on Florida Comprehensive Assessment Test (FCAT) Reading, Writing, Mathematics, and Science tests indicates his or her progress in reaching benchmarks for those subjects. End-of-Course Exams, not yet developed, will measure such progress for other subjects. The curriculum of most public schools in the State of Florida and the FCAT are based upon this state system.

Development of the Sunshine State Standards began in 1993, and they were adopted by the Florida Board of Education in May 1996. The Next Generation Sunshine State Standards were approved between 2007 and 2010.

References

Education in Florida